The Canningites, led by George Canning and then the Viscount Goderich as First Lord of the Treasury, governed the United Kingdom of Great Britain and Ireland from 1827 until 1828.

Formation
On 9 April 1827 the Tory Prime Minister of the United Kingdom, Lord Liverpool, suffered a cerebral haemorrhage. He had been Prime Minister nearly fifteen years, ever since the assassination of his predecessor Spencer Perceval in May 1812. The man chosen to succeed him was the Foreign Secretary and Leader of the House of Commons, George Canning. Canning was very much on the moderate wing of the Tory Party, and many of the more hard-line members of Liverpool's government, including the Home Secretary, Sir Robert Peel, and national hero the Duke of Wellington (Master-General of the Ordnance), refused to serve under him. Canning's government was therefore recruited from the moderate wing of the Tory Party, known as the Canningites, with the support of several members of the Whig Party.

Fate
Canning, who was in poor health at the time of his appointment, died in office on 8 August 1827, and the Leader of the House of Lords F. J. Robinson, 1st Viscount Goderich, 1st Earl of Ripon succeeded him as Prime Minister. However, Goderich's government never even met in a session of Parliament, and was replaced by a High Tory government under the Duke of Wellington on 22 January 1828.

Cabinets

George Canning's Cabinet, April 1827 – August 1827
George Canning – First Lord of the Treasury, Chancellor of the Exchequer and Leader of the House of Commons
Lord Lyndhurst – Lord Chancellor
Lord Harrowby – Lord President of the Council
The Duke of Portland – Lord Privy Seal
William Sturges Bourne – Secretary of State for the Home Department
Lord Dudley – Secretary of State for Foreign Affairs
Lord Goderich – Secretary of State for War and the Colonies and Leader of the House of Lords
William Huskisson – President of the Board of Trade and Treasurer of the Navy
Charles Williams-Wynn – President of the Board of Control
Lord Bexley – Chancellor of the Duchy of Lancaster
Lord Palmerston – Secretary at War
Lord Lansdowne – Minister without Portfolio

Changes
May 1827 – Lord Carlisle, the First Commissioner of Woods and Forests, enters the Cabinet
July 1827 – The Duke of Portland becomes a minister without portfolio. Lord Carlisle succeeds him as Lord Privy Seal. W. S. Bourne succeeds Carlisle as First Commissioner of Woods and Forests. Lord Lansdowne succeeds Bourne as Home Secretary. George Tierney, the Master of the Mint, enters the cabinet

The Viscount Goderich's Cabinet, September 1827 – January 1828
Lord Goderich – First Lord of the Treasury and Leader of the House of Lords
Lord Lyndhurst – Lord Chancellor
The Duke of Portland – Lord President of the Council
The Earl of Carlisle – Lord Privy Seal
The Marquess of Lansdowne – Secretary of State for the Home Department
The Earl of Dudley – Secretary of State for Foreign Affairs
William Huskisson – Secretary of State for War and the Colonies and Leader of the House of Commons
J. C. Herries – Chancellor of the Exchequer
The Marquess of Anglesey – Master-General of the Ordnance
Charles Grant – President of the Board of Trade and Treasurer of the Navy
Charles Williams-Wynn – President of the Board of Control
William Sturges Bourne – First Commissioner of Woods and Forests
Lord Bexley – Chancellor of the Duchy of Lancaster
Viscount Palmerston – Secretary at War

Full list of ministers
This is a list of the members of the government. Members of the Cabinet are indicated by bold typeface.

Notes

References
 Chris Cook and John Stevenson, British Historical Facts 1760–1830
 Joseph Haydn and Horace Ockerby, The Book of Dignities

1827-1828
Government
1827 establishments in the United Kingdom
1828 disestablishments in the United Kingdom
1820s in the United Kingdom
Ministries of George IV of the United Kingdom
Cabinets established in 1827
Cabinets disestablished in 1828